The Shōchō uprising (  or ) was one of the many armed rebellions in Japan during the Muromachi Period and the first launched by the peasants. It occurred between August and September of the year 1428, which in the old Japanese calendar was the 1st year of Shōchō, and is also known as the Shōchō no Tokusei Ikki, the Shocho debt cancellation revolt.

As social anxiety increased as a result of the death of Ashikaga Yoshimochi, of bad harvests due to poor weather since the last year, and of an epidemic of three-day disease (likely cholera), the bashaku of Otsu and Sakamoto in Ōmi Province demanded a debt moratorium.

This revolt spread and extended to all of Kinai as peasants throughout the region who were struggling to repay their debts undertook "independent debt relief" by attacking and looting sake merchants, storehouse money brokers, and temples. The grounds for the so-called "independent debt relief" is supposed to be "daigawari no tokusei", or debt relief at the time when power passes from one shōgun to another.

The shogunate was hard-pressed by this and set about quelling it under the orders of the kanrei Mitsuie Hatakeyama. The head of the samurai-dokoro, Akamatsu Mitsusuke, also sent troops. However, the strength of the insurrection did not diminish but rather it even invaded Kyoto in September and also spread to Nara.

The monk Jinson recorded the following entry about the uprising in the Daijoin nikki mokuroku, his daily journal. "The first year of Shocho, in the ninth month, an uprising of commoners broke out. They claimed debt relief and went on to destroy wine shops, pawn shops, and temples which engaged in usury. They took anything they could lay their hands on, and cancelled the debts. Kanrei Mitsuie Hatakeyama suppressed this. There is nothing more than this incident to bring about the ruin of our country. This is the first time since the founding of Japan that an uprising of commoners ever occurred."

In the end, the Muromachi shogunate did not release a debt cancellation order, but because proof of the farmers' debts had been destroyed during the looting, the "independent debt relief" had effectively achieved the same situation. Furthermore, Kōfuku-ji in Yamato Province formally cancelled debts and because it had turned almost all the territory in the province into its own shōen and exercised power as its shugo, these orders had official binding power and were implemented. An example of one such order is the Yagyū no Tokusei Hibun which was inscribed on a stone monument.

References 

Peasant revolts
Riots and civil disorder in Japan
1428 in Asia
15th century in Japan
Conflicts in 1428
15th-century rebellions
1420s in Japan
Ikki